Dennis Clarke (born 18 January 1948) is an English former professional footballer who played as a defender for West Bromwich Albion, Huddersfield Town and Birmingham City in the Football League.

He has the distinction of being the first substitute to be used in an FA Cup Final, during the 1968 FA Cup Final for West Bromwich Albion against Everton, when he replaced the injured John Kaye.

Honours
West Bromwich Albion
 FA Cup 1968
 Football League Cup 1966
Second Division Championship Medal 1970/71

References

1948 births
Living people
Footballers from Stockton-on-Tees
Footballers from County Durham
Association football defenders
English footballers
West Bromwich Albion F.C. players
Huddersfield Town A.F.C. players
Birmingham City F.C. players
English Football League players
FA Cup Final players